Rivers of Sand is a 1973 documentary film by Robert Gardner that portrays the Hamar people of southwestern Ethiopia.

See also
 List of American films of 1973

References

External links
 
Rivers of Sand Harvard University Profile
Rivers of Sand www.der.org Profile

1973 films
American documentary films
Anthropology documentary films
1973 documentary films
Works about Ethiopia
1970s English-language films
1970s American films